Frauenlob is the name of:

People
 Heinrich Frauenlob (1250/60–1318), a minnesinger

Ships

 , a Prussian schooner